Goiliang is a village and the headquarters of an eponymous circle in the Anjaw district in the north-eastern state of Arunachal Pradesh, India.

Goiliang is situated on the bank of the Dau River (or Dav River), a tributary of the Lohit River. The nearest town is Hayuliang which is also the headquarters of the subdivision.

The Goiliang Circle had a population of 1,681 people in the 2011 census.

References 

Villages in Anjaw district